Meadow Lake Airport may refer to:

 Meadow Lake Airport (Colorado) near Colorado Springs, Colorado, United States
 Meadow Lake Airport (Saskatchewan) near Meadow Lake, Saskatchewan, Canada

id:Bandar Udara Meadow Lake
pms:Meadow Lake Airport